Dipu Number Two is a 1996 Bangladeshi film directed by Morshedul Islam. The screenplay was based on the 1984 novel of the same name by Muhammed Zafar Iqbal. It stars Arun Saha, who played the lead role of "Dipu" and Subhashish as Tarique, supporting actors are Abul Khair, Masud Ali Khan, Bulbul Ahmed, Dolly Jahur and Bobita. The film won two national film awards for best child actor (Arun Saha) and best supporting actor (Bulbul Ahmed).

Plot 
Dipu (Arun Saha), a boy of about twelve years lives with his father (Bulbul Ahmed). Dipu's father is a government officer and because of his transferable job, they arrive at a picturesque town. Dipu immediately develops a liking to this new town and his new school. He makes a lot of friends but starts a feud with the school bully Tarique (Shubhashish) on the very first day. Tarique, unable to intimidate Dipu tries many tricks on him and even beats him up one day. Though Dipu does not complain this to anybody, instead he contemplates to punish Tarique himself. But one day a small adventure atop a high water tank changes his feelings towards Tarique.

Suddenly, a new event shatters Dipu's small world. He learns that his mother (Bobita) whom he knew to be dead actually left to United States during his childhood. She has returned for a short trip and wants to meet him. Dipu goes to Dhaka to meet her. He has a very brief encounter with his mother which changes his entire outlook to the world. He goes to find Tarique at his place and is exposed to another side of Tarique's life. Dipu finds out that Tarique's mother (Dolly Johur) is demented. Dipu also tells Tarique the truth about his own mother. This sharing brings these two boys much closer. It inspires Tarique to share his most guarded secret. He has discovered a cavern which treasures many antique sculptures. Dipu discloses about their discovery to his classmates and one night, Dipu and Tarique along with other boys set out for a nocturnal adventure to the cavern. To their surprise they find a group of smugglers, who deal in antiques, at operation. With courage and intelligence they manage to capture the whole gang. They are awarded for their heroics. Like all good events, this episode of Dipu's life comes to an end. His father's term at this place is over. He has to leave, but he has already garnered a lot of fond memories to cherish.

Cast 
 Arun Saha - Dipu
 Shubhashish Ray - Tarique, Dipu's best friend
 Abul Khair - class teacher
 Masud Ali Khan - Dipu's maternal relative
 Golam Mustafa - Jamshed uncle
 Bulbul Ahmed - Dipu's father
 Dolly Johur - Tarique's mother
 Bobita - Dipu's mother
 Keramat - Drill teacher

 Rest of Dipu's friends
 Safkat - Sajjad
 Farhad- Babu
 Mushfiq - Tipu
 Mithu - Faisal
 Hira - Nantu
 Piyal - Rafik
 Joyoti - Bilu
 Shimon - Dilu
 Sajib - Ahad
 Other child artists
 Shamsuzzaman Khan Benu
 Abdul Aziz
 Udayan Bikash Barua
 Sa Chin Pru
 Anwara Begum

Soundtrack 
The soundtrack for Dipu Number Two was composed by music director Satya Saha. The soundtrack consists of background score. There is no song in the movie.

Awards

See also 
 Amar Bondhu Rashed

References

External links 
 

Bengali-language Bangladeshi films
Films scored by Satya Saha
1990s Bengali-language films
Films directed by Morshedul Islam